La Nación (Spanish for "The Nation") is an Argentine newspaper.

La Nación may also refer to:

La Nación (Chile), a Chilean newspaper
La Nación (Paraguay), a Paraguayan newspaper
La Nación (San José), a Costa Rican newspaper